VDF may be an acronym for:
 VHF Direction Finder
 Venda Defence Force
 Virginia Defense Force
 Visual DataFlex a Fourth-generation programming language now known simply as DataFlex. 
 FAA LID for: Tampa Executive Airport (formerly known as Vandenberg Airport)
 Vinylidene difluoride, see: 1,1-Difluoroethylene
 Verifiable Delay Function, in Cryptography